Next Goal Wins is an upcoming sports comedy-drama film directed by Taika Waititi, who co-wrote the screenplay with Iain Morris. The film is based on the 2014 documentary of the same name by Mike Brett and Steve Jamison about Dutch-American coach Thomas Rongen's efforts to lead the American Samoa national football team, considered the weakest football team in the world, to qualification for the 2014 FIFA World Cup.

Michael Fassbender will star as Rongen, alongside Oscar Kightley, David Fane, Beulah Koale, Uli Latukefu, Rachel House, Kaimana, Rhys Darby, Will Arnett, and Elisabeth Moss. Filming began in Honolulu in November 2019.

The film is set to be released on September 22, 2023, by Searchlight Pictures.

Premise
Dutch-American football coach Thomas Rongen is tasked with turning the American Samoa national team, considered one of the weakest football teams in the world, into an elite squad.

Cast

Production
It was announced in August 2019 that Fox Searchlight Pictures had set up an initially unspecified project that would see Taika Waititi write and direct prior to his obligations to Thor: Love and Thunder. It was later revealed as being a feature film adaptation of the documentary Next Goal Wins. Waititi, Garrett Basch and Jonathan Cavendish serve as producers, with Andy Serkis, Will Tennant and Kathryn Dean as executive producers.

In September, Michael Fassbender entered final negotiations to star in the film. He would be confirmed the next month, alongside Elisabeth Moss entering negotiations to join. In November 2019, it was announced Kaimana, Oscar Kightley, David Fane, Beulah Koale, Lehi Falepapalangi, Semu Filipo, Uli Latukefu, Rachel House, Rhys Darby, Angus Sampson, Chris Alosio and Sisa Grey had joined the cast of the film, with Moss being confirmed. In December 2019, Armie Hammer joined the cast of the film.

Principal photography began in November 2019 in Honolulu, Hawaii, and wrapped by January 2020. In December 2021, it was announced that Hammer was replaced by Will Arnett in reshoots, in part due to abuse allegations made against Hammer in January 2021. The part, initially meant as a cameo, was expanded upon when Arnett joined.

Release
The film is currently scheduled to be released on September 22, 2023. In September 2022, the film was officially given a release date of April 21, 2023, before being delayed to its current release date.

References

External links
 

2023 comedy films
2020s English-language films
2020s sports comedy films
American sports comedy films
American association football films
American Samoa national football team
British association football films
British sports comedy films
Films directed by Taika Waititi
Films with screenplays by Taika Waititi
Films produced by Taika Waititi
Films scored by Michael Giacchino
Films set in American Samoa
Films shot in Honolulu
Searchlight Pictures films
Upcoming English-language films
2020s American films
2020s British films